Little Grand Rapids First Nation is a remote Anishinaabe (Saulteaux/Ojibwa) First Nation community in northeast Manitoba, located approximately  northeast of Winnipeg.

It is a fly-in community.

On 4 October 2020, a COVID-19 outbreak was declared in Little Grand Rapids. With 33 confirmed cases at the time, it had the highest number of cases of any First Nation in Manitoba.

Reserve 
The First Nation has one reserve: Little Grand Rapids 14, which is located across the channel in the Family Lake from the community of Little Grand Rapids.

Governance
Little Grand Rapids First Nation is governed by the Act Electoral System of government. The current leadership as of 2021 includes Chief Oliver Owen, and Councillors Clinton Keeper, Diane Keeper, Roy Dunsford, Hilda Crow, Cher Kejick, and Blair Owen.

Little Grand Rapids First Nation is a member of the Southeast Resource Development Council and a signatory to Treaty 5.

External links
 profile from AANDC
 Southeast Community Futures Development Corporation profile
 Map of Little Grand Rapids 14 at Statcan

References

Southeast Resource Development Council
First Nations governments in Manitoba
Saulteaux
First Nations in Northern Region, Manitoba
First Nations in Eastman Region, Manitoba